HD-PLC (short for High Definition Power Line Communication) is one of the wired communication technologies. It adopts high frequency band (2 MHz~28 MHz)  over mediums like powerlines, phone lines, twisted-pair, and coaxial cables. It is the IEEE 1901-based standard.

Specification and features 
There are essentially two different types of HD-PLC: HD-PLC Complete and HD-PLC Multi-hop. They are incompatible.

HD-PLC Complete 
This is for high speed applications such as TV, AV, and surveillance camera.  

The major technical features include: 

 IEEE 1901 full compliant
 QoS by the priority control
 CSMA/CA and DVTP(Dynamic Virtual Token Passing) supported
 Concurrent multi-AV stream, VoIP, and file transfer and file transfer supported using IP packet classification
 Multi-network access at priority CSMA/CA with network synchronization

HD-PLC Multi-hop 
This is for long-distance applications such as smart meter, building network, factory, energy management, and IoT devices. 

The major technical features include: 

 ITU-T G.9905 multihop technology

Common features  
 Uplinking/downlinking through 432 of 26 MHz (between 1.8 MHz and 28 MHz) bandwidth subcarriers with Wavelet OFDM
 Maximum 240 Mbit/s PHY rate
 Multilevel modulation for each subcarrier which suits the properties of the power line transmission channel and allows for the best transmission speed
 Subcarrier masking with the arbitrary number which can comply with the rules in each country
 Forward error correction (FEC) which enables effective frame transmission
 Channel estimation launch system with change detector for cycle and transmission channel
 HD-PLC network bridging compatible to Ethernet address system
 Advanced encryption with 128 bit AES

4th-generation HD-PLC (HD-PLC Quatro Core technology)  
We now come to communication speed issues like high-definition video images (4K/8K) or in some cases multi hop technology is not enough to reach an isolated and distant PLC terminal. HD-PLC Quatro Core has been designed to solve these problems. This technology is an improvement on the conventional HD-PLC in both communication distance and speed. It achieves to double conventional HD-PLC's communication distance by adopting a communication band of 1/2 or 1/4 of conventional HD-PLC band and achieves to offer a maximum physical line transmission rate of 1 Gbit/s by using an expanded communication band 2 or 4 times the conventional HD-PLC band.

Use cases 
There are a few strengths of using HD-PLC technology on existing wires. 

　1. Expectable higher speed performance

　2. Cost reduction on network construction by existed infrastructure

　3. Support the area where the radio waves is difficult to be reached

　4. Wire saving by sharing power lines and communication lines

Typical use case include: 

 HVAC systems
 Building Automation
 PV panel
 Smart meter
 Street light
 Surveillance camera system
 Video entry system
 Tunnel
 Robot wire saving

See also 

 Power-line communication
 IEEE 1901
 HomePlug
 G.hn
 LonWorks
 BACnet

References 

Computer networking
Internet access